Kastl may refer to the following places in Bavaria, Germany:

Kastl, Upper Bavaria, in the district of Altötting
Kastl, Amberg-Sulzbach, in the district of Amberg-Sulzbach
Kastl, Tirschenreuth, in the district of Tirschenreuth
Kastl Abbey, a former monastery in Kastl, Amberg-Sulzbach